Pila scutata is a species of gastropod belonging to the family Ampullariidae.

The species is found in Southeastern Asia and Central America.  However, it has been taken from its native habitat to be used as a food delicacy, control of weeds in freshwater, a component in home aquariums, and as a vector for parasitic larva in the freshwater. This has made it very difficult to determine Pila scutata's true native range.

References

Ampullariidae